This is a list of radio stations in Bay of Plenty in New Zealand. Most Bay of Plenty stations broadcast from Tauranga, Rotorua and Whakatāne.

Western Bay of Plenty

FM stations

AM stations

Low power FM stations

Rotorua

FM stations

AM stations

Low power FM stations

Eastern Bay of Plenty

References

Bay of Plenty
Bay of Plenty Region